Shackleton is a special service area in the Rural Municipality of Miry Creek No. 229, Saskatchewan, Canada. It previously held the status of village until December 31, 2013.

History 
Prior to December 31, 2013, Shackleton was incorporated as a village, and was restructured as a social service area under the jurisdiction of the Rural Municipality of Miry Creek No. 229 on that date.

Demographics 

See also 
List of communities in Saskatchewan
Hamlets of Saskatchewan

References 

Miry Creek No. 229, Saskatchewan
Designated places in Saskatchewan
Former villages in Saskatchewan
Unincorporated communities in Saskatchewan
Populated places disestablished in 2013